Oddbjørn Engvold (born 7 April 1938) is a Norwegian astronomer.

He was born in Askim. His specialty is solar physics, and he was appointed as a professor at the University of Oslo in 1989. He was secretary general of the International Astronomical Union from 2003 to 2006 and a member of the board of Norwegian Academy of Science and Letters from 1993 to 1998.

References

1938 births
Living people
Norwegian astronomers
Academic staff of the University of Oslo
Members of the Norwegian Academy of Science and Letters
People from Askim